Colonides or Kolonides, also known as Colonis or Kolonis (Κολωνίς) or as Colone or Kolone (Κολώνη), was a town in the southwest of ancient Messenia described by Pausanias as standing upon a height at a short distance from the sea, and 40 stadia from Asine. The inhabitants affirmed that they were not Messenians, but a colony led from Athens by Colaenus. It is mentioned by Plutarch as a place which Philopoemen marched to relieve leading to his capture and execution; but according to the narrative of Livy, Corone was the place towards which Philopoemen marched. 

Its site is located near the modern Vournaria.

References

Populated places in ancient Messenia
Former populated places in Greece
Athenian colonies